Gwynfi is an electoral ward of Neath Port Talbot county borough, Wales.

Gwynfi includes the villages if Abergwynfi and Blaengwynfi.  Gwynfi is part of the community of Glyncorrwg and the parliamentary constituency of Aberavon.

Gwynfi is bounded by the wards of: Glyncorrwg to the northwest; Treherbert of Rhondda Cynon Taff to the east; Blaengarw of Bridgend county borough to the south; and Cymmer to the west.  The northern part of the ward is covered in woodland whereas the south of the ward comprises open moorland.

In June 2018, Labour's Ralph Thomas resigned as councillor. On 16 August 2018, a by-election was held, the electorate turnout was 51.3%. Jane Jones was returned to the seat, having previously been councillor until May 2012. The swing in votes was attributed to a threat from the Labour controlled council to close Cymer Afan School. The results were:

In the 2017 local council elections, the results were:

In the 2012 local council elections, the electorate turnout was 63.84%.  The results were:

References

Electoral wards of Neath Port Talbot
Afan Valley